Thomas Steele VC (6 February 1891 – 11 July 1978) was an English recipient of the Victoria Cross, the highest and most prestigious award for gallantry in the face of the enemy that can be awarded to British and Commonwealth forces. A soldier with the Seaforth Highlanders during the First World War, he was awarded the VC for his actions on 22 February 1917, during the Mesopotamian campaign.

VC action
He was 26 years old, and a sergeant in the 1st Battalion, Seaforth Highlanders (Ross-shire Buffs, Duke of Albany's), British Army during the First World War when the following deed took place for which he was awarded the VC.

Rugby league
Steele played three matches as a professional for Broughton Rangers, one of rugby league's founding clubs, and enjoyed a distinguished career as an amateur with his local club, Healey Street.

References

Monuments to Courage (David Harvey, 1999)
The Register of the Victoria Cross (This England, 1997)

External links
(archived by web.archive.org) Location of grave and VC medal (Lancashire)

1891 births
1978 deaths
British Army personnel of World War I
British Army recipients of the Victoria Cross
British World War I recipients of the Victoria Cross
Broughton Rangers players
English rugby league players
People from Saddleworth
Rugby league players from Oldham
Seaforth Highlanders soldiers